The Keep A Breast Foundation (KAB) is a 501(c)(3) non-profit organization focused on breast cancer prevention and education, based in Los Angeles, California, United States. The organization was founded by Shaney jo Darden and Mona Mukherjea-Gehrig in 2000, officially gaining NPO status in 2005. KAB first gained national prominence with their “i love boobies!” bracelets, which were the focus of a U.S. federal court case. Promoting breast cancer prevention via means of education and early detection remains a key focus of KAB's campaigns.

Programs

Check Yourself! 
The CYS program creates and distributes breast health education through printed materials, blogs, and the Check Yourself! App.

Check Yourself's primary focus is raising awareness on the importance of doing a monthly breast self-check. With 40% of diagnosed breast cancers being self-detected, KAB believes that establishing what is “normal” for you is an important step to knowing your body.

In 2018, over 160,000 CYS cards were distributed globally.

Treasured Chest 
This program supports women diagnosed with breast cancer or testing positive with the BRCA1 or BRCA2 gene with an opportunity to create their own breast cast. TCP kits have been sent out to all 50 states, with a large portion of them having gone out to women under 40.

Non-Toxic Revolution 
The NTR mission is to inform, educate and inspire young people to revolt against the dangers of toxic chemicals in their environment and food supply, especially those linked to the development of breast cancer. Its aim is to focus on prevention as a means to maintain long-term health and well-being. Non-Toxic Revolution also provides alternative choices so that young people everywhere can make smart changes.

Campaigns

i love boobies! 
In 2008, KAB released their “i love boobies!” shame-free breast awareness message. This message was designed to take a positive approach to breast cancer dialogue. It particularly resonates with young people and encourages them to be open and active about breast cancer prevention.

i love boobies! is focused on sparking dialogue among young people about breast cancer and breast health. Many different kinds of i love boobies! merchandise has been made to further this cause, and revenues from this merchandise fund KAB programs and campaigns, broaden its reach and in the past, provide grant money supporting important studies.

School controversy 
The "i love boobies!" bracelets were created by the Keep A Breast Foundation in 2004. The Foundation created and sold a series of one-inch wide silicone rubber bracelets, emblazoned with the slogan "i ♥ boobies! (Keep A Breast)" to raise money and create a conversation about breast cancer among young people. The positive and upbeat awareness-raising campaign was designed to make young people feel comfortable talking about a subject that is otherwise fearful and taboo.

As the bracelets became a fashion craze among teenagers, many school districts began to ban the wearing of these bracelets as the slogan conflicted with school dress codes that prohibit the wearing of any item that includes sexually suggestive language or pictures.

A dispute over such a ban reached the U.S. Court of Appeals for the Third Circuit. A panel of three of its judges heard the case, and it was then taken up to be re-heard by all 14 judges en banc. The court ruled 9-5 that the school's ban on the bracelets violated the students' right to free speech because the bracelets were not plainly offensive or disruptive and were speech conducted to raise awareness of a social issue. The U.S. Supreme Court later declined to take up the case.

DIY Action 
The DIY Action campaign was created for people that wish to start their own fundraiser benefiting The Keep A Breast Foundation. KAB provides educational materials and awareness merchandise, and the events range anywhere from skateboarding and music events, to cook offs and birthday parties.

#checkyourselfie 
This campaign was created to share the message of breast self-checks with friends and followers via social media platforms. It is meant to encourage people to download the KAB Check Yourself! App, since this has become such an effective way to reach teens and young adults. This app is free to download to phones and devices. It shows and explains how to do a self-check and lets users set a monthly reminder for future checks.

Fit 4 Prevention 
Fit 4 Prevention is a national movement to raise awareness about breast cancer prevention through fitness and wellness. The goal of F4P is to inspire people to reduce their risk of cancers by adopting a healthier, more active lifestyle. KAB works with studios, gyms and individuals around the country to raise funds and increase awareness for The Keep A Breast Foundation and their mission.

Past campaigns 
Imagine If... was a support program intended for young people to share their feelings concerning what the world would be like if there were no cancer. It was part of the Keep A Breast Traveling Education Booth and traveled on music tours, festivals and events around the world. Participants wrote down their response on a small whiteboard, took photos with their Imagine If... response and then shared the photos on the internet and social media.

This is My Story is a campaign that gave people a chance to share the impact breast cancer had on their lives through writing or video. Videos and written testimonies were shared on KAB's YouTube Channel, as well as their website and social media platforms.

Breast cast exhibitions 
Keep A Breast founders developed a technique for creating breast casts at the start of the organization in 2000. The result was a white plaster/gauze cast that can be customized by artists. The first breast cast auction was in 2000. Some past breast cast exhibitions include: Tokyo LOVE show, Keep A Breast PDX, American Rag X LAB Art, Bare Minerals, Bordeaux Love, and Snow Show.

Warped Tour 
Keep A Breast first went on Vans Warped Tour in 2001, and participated each year through 2018, which was the last Vans Warped Tour. This tour was KAB's largest outreach platform, and helped the organization to grow. On this tour, KAB had a tent filled with educational materials and merchandise, as well as volunteers and employees to help educate and provide support for anyone interested. Many of the bands on Vans Warped Tour are Keep A Breast supporters. Through KAB's work with Vans Warped Tour, they were able to take part in several music compilation collaborations featuring many artists they met over the years on tour.

Celebrity involvement 
Many professional athletes, celebrities, artists and well-known individuals have been involved with The Keep A Breast Foundation. Pro surfers Lisa Anderson and Layne Beachley, burlesque stars Dita Von Tesse and Catherine D’lish, musicians Iggy Pop, Kim Gordon of Sonic Youth, Mark Mothersbaugh of DEVO, Katy Perry and Tom Delonge of Blink 182 and Angels & Airwaves, and artists Shepard Fairey, Mike Giant, Ed Templeton and Dalek to name a few of the big names that have been supporters and contributed to KAB.

Partnerships 
The Keep A Breast Foundation partners with many different companies and organizations to help further their reach. Some of these partnerships are for the month of October, which Keep A Breast refers to as Breast Cancer Prevention Month and some go year round. The support these partnerships offer include product collaborations, outreach, advertising, special events and promotions. A few of KAB's partners have included Rastaclat, HUF, True&Co., Valiant Entertainment, and S.W. Basics.

On October 1, 2019, Thrive Causemetics donated 100% of its profits to Keep A Breast Foundation, and donated $5 for every repost on Instagram of a certain image with the hashtag #thrivecausemetics for the rest of October.

Global 
The Keep A Breast Foundation, as stated in its mission, “is a global non-profit organization 2.” KAB has had affiliates in Japan, Canada, Europe, Mexico and Chile. Currently, Keep A Breast Europe is active and has a headquarters in Bordeaux, France, which was developed by Lorene Carpentier, the organizations Global CEO.

Founder 
Shaney jo Daren is the Founder and CCO of The Keep A Breast Foundation. Shaney jo was born in Fullerton, CA and grew up in Southern California. She began her career in fashion design, which she did predominantly in the action sports industry. In 2008, she quit her job and began focusing on Keep A Breast full-time, shortly after moving the foundation out of her home, and into an office in Carlsbad, CA. Shaney jo did a TEDx talk in 2011 concerning The Keep A Breast Foundation and the “i love boobies!” bracelet controversy.

References

External links 

 Keep A Breast
 Non-Toxic Revolution
 Check Yourself! App
 KAB Channel on YouTube
 Breast Cancer Prevention Resource Guide - Daughters Against Breast Cancer
 The Best Breast Cancer Apps of 2018 - Healthline
 Keep A Breast's Lighthearted Touch Inspires Youthful Breast Cancer Awareness and Prevention - Fast Company

Breast cancer organizations
Cancer charities in the United States
Non-profit organizations based in Los Angeles
Charities based in California
Medical and health organizations based in California
Medical and health foundations in the United States
Organizations established in 2000